Abu al-Fadl was a Palestinian village in the Ramle Subdistrict, about  northwest of Ramla in, what was until 1948, Mandatory Palestine. The village was also known as al-Satariyya. In 1945/44, the village had a population of 510.

Location
The village was located just south of Sarafand al-Amar, in the Ramleh District.

History
The village land was owned by the Islamic waqf of Fadl ibn Abbas, possibly a cousin of the Islamic prophet Muhammad, after whom the village was named. In the Palestine Index Gazetteer, Abu al-Fadl was classified as a hamlet.

At the time of the 1931 census, Abu al-Fadl had a population of 1565 residents, all Muslims. (Noted under the name of Es Sautariya).

In the 1945 statistics  the village had a population of 510 Muslims. A total of 818 dunums of village land was used for citrus and bananas, 1,035 dunums were used for cereals, and 822 dunums were irrigated or used for orchards.

1948 and aftermath
In February 1948 it was reported that ten Arabs, one of them a woman, were murdered ("probably") by IZL gunmen, in a grove, where they apparently worked, near the village. This was one of the massacres of Palestinian civilians which was said to "erode Arab morale".

The villagers probably left their homes in the second week of May 1948 during Operation Barak. This campaign was undertaken by the Givati Brigade commanded by Shimon Avidan; its objective was to clear the villages south of Tel Aviv and "cause a wandering of the inhabitants of the smaller settlements in the area". Each ground assault started with a mortar bombardment, followed by the expulsion of the remaining residents and the demolition of houses.

The village was probably permanently occupied during the first stage of Operation Danny, 9–12 July 1948. This offensive, commanded by Yitzhak Rabin, resulted in the expulsion of some 70,000 people from the neighbouring towns of Lod and al-Ramla.

The Palestinian historian Walid Khalidi, described the place in 1992: "Of the original village houses, no more than five still stand, deserted and nearly collapsing. One of these houses, located at the edge of a citrus grove, is made of cement blocks, with rectangular doors and windows and a tiled, sloping roof. Another house, composed of three units, is located in the middle of a citrus grove. A few cypress trees, castor oil (ricinus) plants, and cactuses grow on the site, and Israeli buildings have been constructed nearby. The surrounding lands are cultivated by Israelis."

The Israeli moshav of Sitria was established on village farmlands in 1949, Talmei Menashe was established on the site of the village proper in 1953, and some of Be'er Ya'akov and the eastern reaches of Rishon LeZion are partially on the village's land.

See also
Arab–Israeli conflict
Ethnic cleansing
Depopulated Palestinian locations in Israel

References

Bibliography

External links
Welcome To Abu al-Fadl
Abu al-Fadl (Satariyya), Zochrot
Survey of Western Palestine, Map 13: IAA,  Wikimedia commons
Abu al-Fadl at Khalil Sakakini Cultural Center

Arab villages depopulated during the 1948 Arab–Israeli War
District of Ramla